Soul of a New Machine is the debut studio album by American heavy metal band Fear Factory, released on August 25, 1992 by Roadrunner Records. Although this record was Fear Factory's first studio album to be released, it was actually their second album to be recorded, after Concrete, which was recorded in 1991 but not released until 11 years later. The album was remastered and re-released on October 5, 2004 in a digipak, packaged together with the remastered Fear Is the Mindkiller EP.

Overview
Guitarist Dino Cazares has stated that Soul of a New Machine is a concept album, concerning man's creation of a machine that could be either technological or governmental. It was also confirmed by bassist Christian Olde Wolbers in an interview. The particular concept would later play a more prominent role in some of Fear Factory's later albums.

Although Jason Birchmeier of AllMusic described the album as ushering in the alternative metal era of the 1990s, Soul of a New Machine is instead generally described as death metal, but with elements of genres like industrial metal and, to some extent, grindcore. Author Colin Larkin of The Encyclopedia of Popular Music wrote "Soul of a New Machine established Fear Factory as a genuine death metal force, with a good collection of songs delivered with originality and ferocity."

The record featured a different conceptual style from Fear Factory's later works. "Martyr" is about someone who dies for a cause; "Leechmaster" is about relationship problems; "Scapegoat" was based on how Cazares was once wrongfully accused by the law; "Crisis" is an anti-war song; "Crash Test" concerns animal testing and "Suffer Age" is based on serial killer John Wayne Gacy. The other songs contain different themes. Samples from the movies Full Metal Jacket, Blade Runner, and Apocalypse Now are heard sporadically throughout the album.

Then-bassist Andrew Shives only played live with the group; the bass tracks on the album were performed by Dino Cazares (though Shives was credited as the band's bassist on the album). In 1993 Fear Factory released a 7" single under their Spanish name Factorio De Miedo called Sangre De Ninos. This is the only material that was ever recorded in a studio with Andrew Shives on bass. He was forced to leave the band due to some internal disputes and was replaced by Christian Olde Wolbers in December 1993.

Professional wrestler Jerry Lynn used the song "Scapegoat" as his theme music during his time in Extreme Championship Wrestling. "Big God/Raped Souls" was used in The Crow: City of Angels.

Reception

AllMusic's Jason Birchmeier gave the album three stars out of five, remarking that "Fear Factory were quite ahead of their time in 1992". The critic also noted the diversity of the genres featured in the recording, saying that "Soul of a New Machine was so groundbreaking because it [fused] together some of the best aspects of numerous metal subgenres", which "[resulted] in a unique sound".

Rock Hard rated the album highly, saying that the sound of the album was strange, indescribable yet required listening. Rock Hard also complimented the blending of various sub-genres, with particular note to Burton Bell for managing such an eclectic set of vocals.

Kerrang! (p. 61) - "[The album] contains all the unrefined qualities that would soon make Fear Factory legendary."

Track listing

Credits

Fear Factory
Burton C. Bell – lead vocals (credited as "Dry Lung Vocal Martyr"), programming ("Hardware, Utilities"), intro programming (10) Lyrics
Dino Cazares – (credited as "Discordant") guitars, bass, arrangements
Raymond Herrera - (credited as "Variable Percussive Wrecking") drums
Andrew Shives – bass ("Discordant Bass") (credited but did not participate in recording)

Additional personnel
Colin Richardson – producer, mixing, add. performer (9)
Steve Harris – engineer, mixing
Bradley Cook – assistant engineer
Rober Fayer – assistant engineer, add. performer (9) 
Eddy Schreyer – mastering
Ted Jensen – remastering (Expanded Edition)
Satok Lrak, Karl Kotas (spelled backwards) – computer graphics, art direction
Joe Lance – photography
Lora Porter – executive producer, add. performer (9)
Otis – sampling (credited as "Sample God"),
Darius Seponlou – introduction (5), intro programming (5)
Monte Conner – A&R

References

1992 debut albums
Fear Factory albums
Roadrunner Records albums
Albums produced by Colin Richardson
Concept albums